Richard Chamberlain Sings is the first album released by actor Richard Chamberlain. It would prove his most popular, spawning several hit singles. "Love Me Tender" was released as a single and reached no. 21 on the Billboard Pop singles chart in 1962.

Track listing
"Hi-Lili, Hi-Lo" (Bronisław Kaper, Helen Deutsch)
"All I Have to Do Is Dream" (Boudleaux Bryant)
"I Will Love You" (Barry De Vorzon, Shelby Flint)
"I Hadn't Anyone 'Til You" (Ray Noble)
"Theme from Dr. Kildare (Three Stars Will Shine Tonight)" (Hal Winn, Jerry Goldsmith, Pete Rugolo)
"It's a Lonesome Old Town (When You're Not Around)" (Charles Kisco, Harry Tobias)
"True Love" (Cole Porter)
"I'll Be Around" (Alec Wilder)
"Love Me Tender" (Vera Matson, Elvis Presley)
"All I Do Is Dream of You" (Arthur Freed, Nacio Herb Brown)
"A Quiet Kind of Love" (Sheldon Allman)

Personnel
Jimmie Haskell - arrangements, conductor
David Rose - arranger, conductor on "Theme from Dr. Kildare"
Val Valentin - director of engineering
Gene Trindl - cover photography

1962 debut albums
MGM Records albums
Richard Chamberlain albums
albums arranged by Jimmie Haskell